Surabaya Pasar Turi Station or Surabaya Pasarturi Station (SBI) is the second largest railway station in Surabaya, East Java. Located near the biggest market Pasar Turi, Semarang 1 street, Gundih, Bubutan, Surabaya.
Pasar Turi Station has passenger trains that travel to the west of Surabaya such as to Jakarta and Semarang.
The station is currently underway upgrading railway signal and railroad switch devices from mechanical to electrical type produced by PT. LEN Indonesia.

Services 
The following is a list of train services at the Surabaya Pasar Turi Station

Executive Class 

 Argo Bromo Anggrek to 
 Sembrani to 
 Sembrani Tambahan to

Mixed Class (executive, business and economy) 

 Gumarang to 
 Dharmawangsa Ekspres to 
 Harina to  via 
 Mutiara Selatan to Bandung via Yogyakarta
 Sancaka Utara to  via -

Premium Economy Class 

 Kertajaya to 
 Maharani to

Economy Plus Class 

 Ambarawa Ekspres to 
 Airlangga to 
 Pasundan to Bandung

Local and Commuter Train 

 Komuter Sulam to 
 Cepu Local Train to

References

External links
 

Railway stations in Surabaya
Railway stations opened in 1900